Dowson is a surname. Notable people with the surname include:

 Anne Lagacé Dowson, Canadian broadcaster and politician
 David Dowson (born 1988), English footballer
 Duncan Dowson (1928–2020), British engineer and professor emeritus at University of Leeds
 Edward Dowson (cricketer, born 1838) (1838–1922), English cricketer
 Edward Dowson (cricketer, born 1880) (1880–1933), English cricketer
 Ernest Dowson (1867–1900), British poet
 James "Jim" Dowson (born 1964), British far-right political activist
 John Dowson (1820–1881), historian of India
 Murray Dowson (1915–?), Canadian Trotskyist
 Phil Dowson (born 1981), English rugby player
 Philip Dowson (1924–2014), British architect
 Ross Dowson (1918–2002), Canadian Trotskyist

See also 
 Dawson (disambiguation)

English-language surnames